Violuric acid is an organic compound with the formula HON=C(CONH)2CO. It crystallizes as white or off-white monohydrate. The compound has attracted attention because its salts are deeply colored.

Reactions
It readily deprotonated to give salts of the anion [ON=C(CONH)2CO]−, which are often deeply colored.

Preparation
It was prepared  by Adolf Baeyer by reaction of barbituric acid with nitrous acid. It can also be produced by condensation of alloxan with hydroxylamine. as typical for forming the oxime of other carbonyl compounds.

Analytical reagents 

Violuric acid and many of its derivatives, such as thiovioluric acid, 1,3-dimethylvioluric acid, and diphenylthiovioluric acid, have historically been used as analytical reagents for specrophotometric determination and titration of various metals and metal-ions. It was also used as a novel staining/spraying agent for inorganic paper chromatography to identify and separate metals based on color. Most derivitaves of violuric acid will also typically form brightly colored salts with most metals and nitrogen bases.

Because of the characteristic and diverse colors that violuric acid forms with alkali metals, it has been used photometrically to determine the amount of sodium in blood serum.

References

Barbiturates
Nitroso compounds
Oximes